Cheadle LNW railway station was a railway station that served Cheadle, Cheshire, England, between 1866 and its closure in 1917.

Construction, location and facilities

The London and North Western Railway completed its line from Stockport Edgeley to Northenden in 1866. The station was opened on 1 August 1866 and was located 100 yards (90 m) north of Cheadle High street at the point where the line (still in use) crossed Manchester Road on an over-bridge.  The station was located on the western side of the road and was reached by steps leading up to it. Two platforms were provided. The northern platform handled trains from Warrington to Stockport and the southern side was for trains heading west to Warrington and Liverpool.

Train services and closure

On the opening of the line and the station in 1866, the LNWR immediately commenced operating a passenger train service from Manchester London Road via Stockport Edgeley to Cheadle and onwards to Northenden to Broadheath, Warrington Arpley and on to Liverpool Lime Street.

In December 1895, 20 trains per weekday operated from Manchester via Stockport. Seven of these continued on to Broadheath near Altrincham, and two of these continued to Liverpool.

The service was discontinued on 1 January 1917 and the station was closed that day.

LNWR (and from 1923, London Midland and Scottish Railway) goods trains continued to use the line through the station's site from 1917 until 1948.  From that date, the trains were operated by British Railways London Midland Region until 21 August 1967, though it was renamed Cheadle South from 1 July 1950.

Proposed new station
In 2021, Stockport Metropolitan Borough Council proposed a new station for Cheadle on the same site, on the Mid-Cheshire line. The station would be built on the car park for Alexandra Hospital. In 2022 the UK government committed funding to the project and the station is expected to open in 2025. It is expected to have a single 100m long platform.

Railway diagram showing Cheadle LNW station and the line to Stockport

References

Notes

Bibliography

 

Disused railway stations in the Metropolitan Borough of Stockport
Former London and North Western Railway stations
Railway stations in Great Britain opened in 1866
Railway stations in Great Britain closed in 1917
Cheadle, Greater Manchester